The Carolina Bird Club (CBC), located in Raleigh, North Carolina, and founded on March 6, 1937, is a non-profit organization that promotes bird-watching as well as ornithological conservation and education efforts. It has published a bulletin known as The Chat since its founding in 1937. The current president of the Carolina Bird Club is Christine Stoughton-Root of Pamlico County, North Carolina.

History

The Carolina Bird Club was founded after the pastor of the West Raleigh Presbyterian Church, John H. Grey Jr., proposed the creation of a state bird club. The six other founding members were:

 H.H. Brimley, Director of the State Museum
 C.S. Brimley, State Entomologist for the North Carolina Department of Agriculture and brother of H.H. Brimley, who together co-authored Birds of North Carolina (Pearson et al., 1919)
 Harry T. Davis, member of the State Museum and later its director
 Carey Bostian, a professor of zoology at North Carolina State College
 Mrs. Green, a member of the Raleigh Woman's Club and nature columnist for The News & Observer
 A seventh person whose name is unknown

After Grey declined the presidency to act instead as secretary, treasurer, and editor, Clement S. Brimley was selected as the club's first president.

References

External links
 CarolinaBirdClub.org, official site
 The First 50 Years: A Brief History of Carolina Bird Club by Eloise Potter, Carolina Bird Club

Ornithological organizations in the United States
Bird conservation organizations
Environmental organizations based in North Carolina
Organizations established in 1937
1937 establishments in North Carolina
Organizations based in Raleigh, North Carolina